

167001–167100 

|-id=010
| 167010 Terracina ||  || Annalisa Terracina (born 1973) is married to Italian astronomer Ernesto Palomba, who co-discovered this minor planet. || 
|-id=018
| 167018 Csontoscsaba ||  || Csaba Csontos (born 1940), a Hungarian architect || 
|}

167101–167200 

|-id=113
| 167113 Robertwick ||  || Bob Wick (born 1935), American sculptor, co-chairman of Wick Communications, member of the Arizona Astronomy Board, and light pollution advocate || 
|}

167201–167300 

|-id=208
| 167208 Lelekovice ||  || The Czech village of Lelekovice, birthplace of co-discoverer Kamil Hornoch, on the occasion of the 720th anniversary of the founding of the village || 
|}

167301–167400 

|-id=341
| 167341 Börzsöny || 2003 VG || Börzsöny, a mountain range in northern Hungary. || 
|}

167401–167500 

|-bgcolor=#f2f2f2
| colspan=4 align=center | 
|}

167501–167600 

|-bgcolor=#f2f2f2
| colspan=4 align=center | 
|}

167601–167700 

|-bgcolor=#f2f2f2
| colspan=4 align=center | 
|}

167701–167800 

|-id=748
| 167748 Markkelly ||  || Mark Kelly (born 1964), an astronaut who has flown on four NASA shuttle missions || 
|}

167801–167900 

|-id=852
| 167852 Maturana || 2005 DM || Angelica Maturana (born 1971), friend of Italian co-discoverer Andrea Boattini || 
|-id=875
| 167875 Kromminga ||  || Albion Kromminga (born 1933), an American physics professor at Calvin College || 
|}

167901–168000 

|-id=960
| 167960 Rudzikas ||  || Zenonas Rokus Rudzikas (born 1940), Lithuanian theoretical physicist, author president of the Lithuanian Academy of Sciences, and director of the Vilnius University Institute of Theoretical Physics and Astronomy || 
|-id=971
| 167971 Carlyhowett ||  || Carly J. Howett (born 1979) is a research scientist at Southwest Research Institute, who served as an encounter Composition Team co-investigator for the New Horizons Mission to Pluto. || 
|-id=976
| 167976 Ormsbymitchel ||  || Ormsby M. Mitchel (1809–1862) was an astronomer who founded the Cincinnati Observatory and later became director of the Dudley Observatory. He published the first popular journal of astronomy (The Sidereal Messenger) in the United States and confirmed that the star Antares is a double star. || 
|}

References 

167001-168000